Petar Orlandić (born 6 August 1990) is a Montenegrin footballer who play for Zvijezda 09 as a forward.

Club career

Zeta
Orlandić first began playing football with FK Ribnica before he was recruited by first-tier club Zeta. He made his debut in the Montenegrin top flight with Zeta in 2009, where for a period of time became the top scorer for the club and the league in the 2013–2014, during which he scored 12 goals in 16 matches. On October 31, 2014, Orlandić scored a hat-trick against Berane.

Loan to Hapoel Tel Aviv
On February 5, 2014, Orlandić went on a 6-month loan to Hapoel Tel Aviv, with an option for Hapoel to buy out his contract after the 6 months expired. However, he saw minimal playing time with Hapoel, and his nine appearances for the team accumulated only about 90 minutes of playing time. Orlandić scored a total of two league goals for Hapoel.

Red Star Belgrade
On February 6, 2015, he signed a 3-year contract with Serbian club Red Star Belgrade. After Orlandić scored a goal against FK Rad on May 3, 2015, Serbian sports portal "Mozzart Sport" commented that Orlandić and Luka Jović were becoming a formidable striker tandem.

Spartak Trnava
Orlandić had joined Spartak Trnava in January 2017. He made his debut in Slovakia on 16 February 2020 in a grand derby match against reigning champions and table leaders Slovan Bratislava. The home fixture at Anton Malatinský Stadium had concluded in a goal-less tie and Orlandić completed the entire match.

In another home fixture against ViOn Zlaté Moravce, on 1 March 2020, he scored his first goal for Spartak by equalising a game in the 76th minute, scoring by a header after a cross by Yann Michael Yao. While ViOn took the lead in the first-half through Tomáš Ďubek, Trnava took the victory after a stoppage-time goal by Alex Sobczyk. Orlandić also conceded a yellow card in the second half. 

In the following game against DAC Dunajská Streda, Orlandić suffered a seriously looking open head injury. While he was supposed to leave the pitch, he refused and collapsed after the final blow.

Fortuna Liga was then postponed due to coronavirus pandemic. As Spartak resumed training process, it was announced, on 5 May 2020, that Orlandić was removed from the first squad due to disciplinary issues, which effectively meant he became club-less, as the B-squad's season was annulled due to the pandemic.

Zvijezda 09
After a spell at FK Zeta in 2021, Orlandić was club-less for several months, before he in March 2022 signed with Bosnian First League of the Republika Srpska club Zvijezda 09.

Honours

Club
Red Star Belgrade
 Serbian SuperLiga (1): 2015–16

References

External links

Futbalnet profile 

1990 births
Living people
Footballers from Podgorica
Association football forwards
Montenegrin footballers
FK Zeta players
Hapoel Tel Aviv F.C. players
Red Star Belgrade footballers
C.F. União players
Xinjiang Tianshan Leopard F.C. players
Birkirkara F.C. players
Petar Orlandic
FC Spartak Trnava players
FK Zvijezda 09 players
Montenegrin First League players
Israeli Premier League players
Serbian SuperLiga players
Segunda Divisão players
China League One players
Maltese Premier League players
Petar Orlandic
Slovak Super Liga players
Montenegrin expatriate footballers
Expatriate footballers in Israel
Montenegrin expatriate sportspeople in Israel
Expatriate footballers in Serbia
Montenegrin expatriate sportspeople in Serbia
Expatriate footballers in Portugal
Montenegrin expatriate sportspeople in Portugal
Expatriate footballers in China
Montenegrin expatriate sportspeople in China
Expatriate footballers in Malta
Montenegrin expatriate sportspeople in Malta
Expatriate footballers in Thailand
Montenegrin expatriate sportspeople in Thailand
Expatriate footballers in Slovakia
Montenegrin expatriate sportspeople in Slovakia
Expatriate footballers in Bosnia and Herzegovina
Montenegrin expatriate sportspeople in Bosnia and Herzegovina